Aitipol Kaewkeaw (born December 11, 1988) is a Thai professional footballer who plays as a right-back for Krabi in Thai League 2.

Honours
Krabi
 Thai League 3 runners-up: 2021–22
 Thai League 3 Southern Region winners: 2021–22

References

External links
 
 https://www.livesoccer888.com/thaipremierleague/2018/teams/PT-Prachuap-FC/Players/Aitipol-Kaewkeaw

1988 births
Living people
Aitipol Kaewkeaw
Association football defenders
Aitipol Kaewkeaw
Aitipol Kaewkeaw
Aitipol Kaewkeaw
Aitipol Kaewkeaw
Aitipol Kaewkeaw
Aitipol Kaewkeaw